Germano Mathias (2 June 1934 – 22 February 2023) was a Brazilian singer-songwriter and composer, who specialized in sambas. He was nicknamed the "Catedrático do Samba" ("the Samba Cathedratic").

Life and career
Born in São Paulo, the son of two Portuguese immigrants, Mathias studied drums at the Rosas Negras School of Samba. He started his career as a musician in 1955, winning a 14-month contract with Radio Tupi in the radio contest for new music artists "À procura de um astro" ("Looking for a star"). Following his first hit "Minha nega na janela", in a few years he got a significant success both as a singer and as a composer, but his popularity declined with the arrival of rock and other musical genres, up to the point he temporarily left his musical activities to work as a justice officer. His career eventually had a resurgence in the late 1970s, when Gilberto Gil recorded several songs composed by him, leading to many of his previous works to be rediscovered and re-released.

Mathias' last album was Tributo a Caco Velho, released in 2004. In 2021, the tribute album #PartiuZePelintra – Tributo a Germano Mathias was released, with some of his songs performed by prominent artists including Gilberto Gil, Fafá de Belém, Zélia Duncan and Leila Pinheiro.

Mathias died from complications of pneumonia on 22 February 2023, at the age of 88. At the time of his death he was preparing a new album, 67 anos de samba-tradição.

Discography 
Albums
 1957 - Germano Matias, o sambista diferente
 1958 - Em continência do samba
 1959 - Hoje tem batucada
 1962  - Ginga no asfalto
 1965 - Samba de branco
 1968  - O Catedrático do Samba
 1970 - 1970 Sambas pra seu governo (with Demônios da Garoa)
 1971  - Samba é comigo mesmo
 1973 - O Catedrático do samba 2 1999  - História do samba paulista (with Aldo Bueno, Thobias da Vai-Vai and Osvaldinho da Cuíca)
 2002 - MPB Especial 2002 - Talento de bamba 2004 - Tributo a Caco Velho''

References

External links 

 
 

1934 births
2023 deaths
People from Feira de Santana 
Brazilian television actors  
Brazilian film actors  
Brazilian stage actors 
Brazilian male actors